Paul Harris Freedman (born September 15, 1949) is an American historian and medievalist who serves as the Chester D. Tripp Professor of History at Yale University; he is a recipient of the Haskins Medal for his work regarding Medieval Europe. Freedman specializes in medieval social history, the history of Catalonia, the study of medieval peasantry, and the history of American cuisine. Freedman is the author of more than 10 books and 40 academic papers having been published by Princeton University, Yale University, Harvard University, Cambridge University, University of Toronto, and the University of Bologna, among others. He wrote extensively on the history of the Middle Ages during his career as a historian though he has recently shifted to culinary history. 

Freedman was awarded a BA at the University of California, Santa Cruz and an M.L.S. from the School of Library and Information Studies at the University of California, Berkeley. He received a doctorate in History at Berkeley in 1978 and then taught for 18 years at Vanderbilt University before joining the faculty of Yale University in 1997. Freedman was a member of the Institute for Advanced Study in Princeton, New Jersey, from 1986 until 1987 and was elected to the American Philosophical Society in 2011. He served as the director of the Robert Penn Warren Center for the Humanities at Vanderbilt University from 1993 to 1997 and was chair of the Department of History at Yale University from 2004 until 2007. Freedman also currently serves as a member on the editorial board of Speculum at the University of Chicago and the American Academy of Arts & Sciences.

His book,  (published 1999), won the Medieval Academy's Haskins Medal and the Otto Gründler Prize of the Medieval Institute at Western Michigan University.

Early life and education 
Freedman was born in New York City to a Jewish family; his father was a doctor and his mother was an economist. He attended the Walden School, matriculating at the University of California, Santa Cruz, in Merrill College where he studied under Peter Kenez. Freedman also spent time at Barcelona, Spain, and in Indonesia studying the local culture in college before moving on to earn his Doctor of Philosophy at the University of California, Berkeley. Upon earning his doctorate, Freedman taught history briefly for one year at the University of California, Davis.

Bibliography
 
 
 
 
 
 
 
 Why Food Matters, 2021

Lectures
(video) HIST 210: The Early Middle Ages, 284–1000 (Fall 2011), by Paul H. Freedman at Open Yale Courses.

References

External links

 Transcript of interview with Ramona Koval, The Book Show, ABC Radio National, on his book "Out of the East:spices and the medieval imagination".
 His page at Yale.edu
 His website

Living people
Yale University faculty
Members of the Institute for Catalan Studies
1949 births